Thomas McKnight is a personal name. It may refer to:

Thomas McKnight (artist), American painter
Thomas McKnight (Iowa pioneer), Iowa lawyer, businessman and politician
Thomas McKnight (Wisconsin pioneer), Wisconsin local pioneer and local politician
Tom McKnight (1868–1930) English footballer

See also
 Thomas MacKnight (disambiguation)